Jim Tarle (born December 27, 1972) is a former American football placekicker. He played for the Jacksonville Jaguars from 2000 to 2001.

References

1972 births
Living people
American football placekickers
South Carolina Gamecocks football players
Arkansas State Red Wolves football players
Jacksonville Jaguars players
Frankfurt Galaxy players